T-box transcription factor TBX1 also known as T-box protein 1 and testis-specific T-box protein is a protein that in humans is encoded by the TBX1 gene. Genes in the T-box family are transcription factors that play important roles in the formation of tissues and organs during embryonic development. To carry out these roles, proteins made by this gene family bind to specific areas of DNA called T-box binding element (TBE) to control the expression of target genes.

Gene 

The TBX1 gene is located on the long (q) arm of chromosome 22 at position 11.21, from base pair 18,118,779 to base pair 18,145,669.

Function 

The T-box 1 protein appears to be necessary for the normal development of large arteries that carry blood out of the heart, muscles and bones of the face and neck, and glands such as the thymus and parathyroid. Although the T-box 1 protein acts as a transcription factor, it is not yet known which genes are regulated by the protein.

Clinical significance 

Most cases of 22q11.2 deletion syndrome are caused by the deletion of a small piece of chromosome 22. This region of the chromosome contains about 30 genes, including the TBX1 gene. In a small number of affected individuals without a chromosome 22 deletion, mutations in the TBX1 gene are thought to be responsible for the characteristic signs and symptoms of the syndrome. Of the three known mutations, two mutations change one amino acid (a building block of proteins) in the T-box 1 protein. The third mutation deletes a single amino acid from the protein. These mutations likely disrupt the ability of the T-box 1 protein to bind to DNA and regulate the activity of other genes.

Loss of the TBX1 gene, due to either a mutation in the gene or a deletion of part of chromosome 22, is responsible for many of the features of 22q11.2 deletion syndrome. Specifically, a loss of the TBX1 gene is associated with heart defects, an opening in the roof of the mouth (a cleft palate), distinctive facial features, and low calcium levels, but does not appear to cause learning disabilities.

Mutation in TBX1 causes predisposition to hernias.

References

Further reading

External links 
 
 
 
 

Transcription factors